Trigonopterus kintamanensis is a species of flightless weevil in the genus Trigonopterus from Indonesia.

Etymology
The specific name is derived from that of the type locality.

Description
Individuals measure 2.28–2.45 mm in length.  Body is slightly oval in shape.  General coloration black, with rust-colored antennae and legs.

Range

Phylogeny
T. kintamanensis is part of the T. saltator species group.

References

kintamanensis
Beetles described in 2014
Beetles of Asia
Insects of Indonesia